Kim Bradley may refer to:

 Kim Bradley (surfer) (1955–2009), Australian surfer
 Kim Bradley (cricketer) (born 1967), Australian former cricket player